Alice in Murderland (also known as The Alice in Wonderland Murders) is a 2010 low-budget American horror film written and directed by Dennis Devine. It stars Malerie Grady, Marlene McCohen, Kelly Kula and Christopher Senger.
 
The film has received negative reviews by critics and horror fans.

Plot
Twenty year old Alice Lewis is turning 21, and is upset about it. Her sorors want to cheer her up and decide to hold a birthday party with an Alice in Wonderland theme at Charlene Glass's house. Alice knows that in the basement of that house, her mother, Ann Lewis, was brutally hacked to death by a masked killer 20 years before. The girls set a rule that no cell phones and no boys will be allowed.

Everyone comes dressed as their favorite character from the film. Someone who was not invited comes as the Jabberwocky (a fierce creature from the book) and brings mayhem to the girls' night, as he starts murdering them one by one while the party is taking place.

Cast

Release
Alice in Murderland was produced in 2010 by Tom Cat Films and was released on February 8, 2011 by Brain Damage Films.

Reception
Alice in Murderland received negative reviews from film critics and many horror fans. Criticisms focused on the poor quality of the Jabberwockey's costume, lack of screen-time for the titular character, perceptions of characters as insincere and fake, numerous shots in which film crew and equipment are clearly visible, the identity of the Jabberwocky killer, the throwaway characterizations of Matt and Andrew who had less than five minutes of screentime each, the repetitive soundtrack, and the misrepresentation of the film on the DVD cover.

References

External links

2010 horror films
2010s English-language films
Films based on Alice in Wonderland
American slasher films
2010s slasher films
2010s serial killer films
American serial killer films
American exploitation films
2010 films
2010s American films